KQSN 104.7 FM is a radio station licensed to Ponca City, Oklahoma. The station broadcasts a country music format and is owned by Sterling Broadcasting LLC.

On September 12, 2018, KQSN changed their format from adult contemporary to country, branded as "104.7 The Bull".

Previous logo

References

External links
https://www.oklahomabull.com

QSN
Country radio stations in the United States